Oleavirus is a genus of viruses, in the family Bromoviridae. Olive trees serve as natural hosts. There is only one species in this genus: Olive latent virus 2.

Structure
Viruses in the genus Oleavirus are non-enveloped, with icosahedral, Quasi-spherical, and Bacilliform geometries, and T=1 symmetry. The diameter is around 26 nm, with a length of 55 nm and a width of 18 nm. Genomes are linear and segmented, tripartite, around 123kb in length.

Life cycle
Viral replication is cytoplasmic, and is lysogenic. Entry into the host cell is achieved by penetration into the host cell. Replication follows the positive stranded RNA virus replication model. Positive stranded rna virus transcription, using the internal initiation model of subgenomic rna transcription is the method of transcription. The virus exits the host cell by tubule-guided viral movement. Olive tree serve as the natural host. Transmission routes are mechanical and grafting.

References

External links
 ICTV Report: Bromoviridae
 Viralzone: Oleavirus

Bromoviridae
Virus genera